Future Politics is the third studio album by Canadian electronic music band Austra, released on January 20, 2017, by Domino worldwide and by Pink Fizz Records in Canada. The album was inspired by frontwoman Katie Stelmanis' time living in Montreal and Mexico City, while also drawing inspiration from Massive Attack, Latin-American record producers (including Chancha Vía Circuito), E. E. Cummings, accelerationism, and Judith Butler. The cover art was photographed at Mexican architect Luis Barragán's Cuadra San Cristóbal in Mexico City.

Track listing

Personnel
Credits adapted from the liner notes of Future Politics.

Austra
 Katie Stelmanis – vocals, production, engineering
 Maya Postepski – additional production 
 Dorian Wolf – synth ; bass

Additional personnel
 Jennifer Mecija – violin 
 Alice Wilder – guitar ; mixing, additional production 
 Heba Kadry – mastering
 Renata Raksha – artwork, photography
 Nick Steinhardt – layout, graphic design

Charts

References

2017 albums
Austra (band) albums
Domino Recording Company albums